The 2008 European Junior Judo Championships is an edition of the European Junior Judo Championships, organised by the European Judo Union.It was held in Warsaw, Poland from 12 to 14 September 2008.

Medal summary

Medal table

Men's events

Women's events

Source Results

References

External links
 

 U21
European Junior Judo Championships
European Championships, U21
Judo
Judo competitions in Poland
Judo
Judo, World Championships U21